Homalonotus is an extinct genus of trilobites in the order Phacopida. It contains several species, including H. armatus and H. roemeri. It is closely related to other trilobites such as Arduennella and Dipleura..

Distribution 
Fossils of Homalonotus have been found in:

Ordovician
France, and the United Kingdom

Silurian
Canada (Nova Scotia), Poland, Sweden (Gotland, Västergötland), the United Kingdom, and the United States (New York)

Devonian
Algeria, Bolivia, Brazil, Uruguay, Colombia (Floresta Formation, Altiplano Cundiboyacense), France, Morocco, New Zealand, Poland, and Ukraine

References

Further reading 
 Cooper, Michael R. A Revision of the Devonian Trilobita from the Bokkeveld Group of South Africa. Cape Town: South African Museum, 1982.
 Salter, John William; Sedgwick, Adam; and Morris, John. A Catalogue of the Collection of Cambrian and Silurian Fossils Contained in the Geolological Museum of the University of Cambridge. Cambridge: University Press, 2010.

External links 

Homalonotidae
Phacopida genera
Trilobites of Africa
Devonian animals of Africa
Devonian trilobites of Europe
Ordovician trilobites of Europe
Silurian trilobites of Europe
Silurian trilobites of North America
Silurian Canada
Paleozoic life of Nova Scotia
Silurian United States
Devonian trilobites of South America
Devonian Bolivia
Devonian Brazil
Devonian Colombia
Fossils of Colombia
Floresta Formation
Late Ordovician first appearances
Middle Devonian genus extinctions
Fossil taxa described in 1825